The Central Directorate of National Savings is the state-owned savings bank of Pakistan. It operates as an attached department of the Finance Division, Ministry of Finance and is headed by Director General. Historically, the operations of National Savings have been geared towards obtaining funds from individual savers in Pakistan in order to provide non-bank financing to the government's fiscal deficit. Towards this aim, the organization offers savings products with competitive interest rates, along with a 100% guarantee from the government treasury on all deposits. Lately, National Savings has played a significant role in Financial Inclusion. National Savings is aggressively improving its customer services through digitization. It has successfully centralized its data and is now about to offer Alternative Delivery Channels for its customers.

History
The history of the National Savings Organization in Pakistan dates back to the British Raj when the Government Savings Bank Act, 1873 was promulgated. During the First and Second World War, the British government used the then National Savings Bureau (NSB) to raise funds to meet war-related expenses. After Pakistan acquired independence in 1947, the organization continued to operate as NSB, before being renamed to Central Directorate of National Savings (CDNS) in 1953. In August 1960, the CDNS was given the status of an "Attached Department" of the Ministry of Finance and made responsible for all policy matters and execution of various National Savings Schemes (NSS). The present structure of CDNS was set up in early 1972 under the Ministry of Finance. 

In August 2019, the government decided to turn National Savings Organization from a government agency into a corporation that will run under the government. Relevant legislation in this regard, Pakistan Savings Bill 2019, is prepared and being finalized.
The prize bond scheme was launched with a Prize Bond of Rs 100. The scheme has been expanded over time. Today we can find around 06 Prize Bonds including Rs 100, 200, 750, 1500, 25000 and Rs 40000.

Finances
The organization manages investments worth  as of FY 2018-19; an amount that is 25% of the country's net savings - making it the largest financial institution in Pakistan. It has 7 million customers, of which 47% are female, leading it to become the financial institution that is closest to gender parity in the country.  The organization sets the rate of interests itself, and revises them at its discretion to offer market-competitive products, and in turn, cheap financing for the government.

Operations
National Savings organizational structure is based on directorates and branches. The Central Directorate, or headquarters, is located in G-6 Markaz, Islamabad. The organization's regional directorates are located in Lahore, Gujranwala, Faisalabad, Karachi, Quetta, Hyderabad, Multan, Sukkur, Bahawalpur, Islamabad, Abbotabad, and Peshawar. Under these regional directorates, there are 376 branches of National Savings Centers across the country.

Investment 
Total investment in National Savings amounts to Rs3.4 trillion.

Products
The organization offers several savings and investment products; including prize bonds, saving certificates, and saving accounts. Most products are available to resident and non-resident Pakistanis, however, some products have restricted access and require specified criteria to be met before they are offered. These restricted access products are italicized in the following products list:
 Prize Bonds
 Premium Prize Bonds
 Regular Income Certificates
 Behbood Savings Certificates
 Defence Savings Certificates
 Special Savings Certificates
 Short Term Savings Certificates
 Pensioners Benefit Account
 Shuhadas Family Welfare Account
 Special Savings Account
 Savings Account

References
 

Pakistan federal departments and agencies
Ministry of Finance (Pakistan)